Sir James Black Baillie,  (24 October 1872 – 9 June 1940) was a British moral philosopher and Vice-Chancellor of the University of Leeds.  He wrote the first significant translation of Hegel's "Phenomenology of Mind." He is said to be the model for the character Sir John Evans in the novel The Weight of the Evidence (1944) by Michael Innes.

Life
Baillie was born in West Mill, Cortachy, Forfarshire and studied  at the University of Edinburgh, where he gained a PhD in 1899 on "The growth of Hegel's logic" and Trinity College, Cambridge.  He lectured in philosophy at University College, Dundee, and in August 1902 was appointed Regius Professor of Moral Philosophy at the University of Aberdeen. In 1906 he married Helena May James: they had no children.

During the First World War he was in the intelligence division of the British Admiralty.  After public service posts he became Vice-Chancellor of the University of Leeds from 1924 to his retirement in 1938.  He died of prostate cancer in Weybridge.

Honours
He was appointed an Officer of the Order of the British Empire in the 1919 New Year Honours, made a Knight Commander of the Order of the Crown of Italy following a meeting with Italian leader Benito Mussolini and received a UK knighthood in 1931.

References

External links
 
 

1872 births
1940 deaths
Officers of the Order of the British Empire
Alumni of the University of Edinburgh
Alumni of Trinity College, Cambridge
Academics of the University of Sheffield
Deaths from prostate cancer
Knights Bachelor
Vice-Chancellors of the University of Leeds
Academics of the University of Dundee
Academics of the University of Aberdeen
British philosophers
Deaths from cancer in England